The 1883 Lewisburg football team represented the University at Lewisburg—now known as Bucknell University—during the 1883 college football season. The team lost its only game to Lafayette.

Schedule

References

Lewisburg
Bucknell Bison football seasons
College football winless seasons
Lewisburg football